Germán Aceros Buenos (30 September 1938 – 29 October 2018) was a Colombian footballer. He competed for the Colombia national football team at the 1962 FIFA World Cup which was held in Chile.

Career
Aceros played football as a right and left winger, central forward and attacking midfielder in Colombia with Atlético Bucaramanga, Millonarios, Deportivo Cali, Independiente Medellín and Deportivo Pereira. He suffered a career-ending knee injury while playing for Real Cartagena in 1972.

After he retired from playing, Aceros became a football coach. He managed Bucaramanga, Deportes Tolima, Liga del Magdalena and Independiente Medellín in Colombia, before moving to Venezuela to manage Minervén.

References

External links

1938 births
2018 deaths
People from Bucaramanga
Colombian footballers
Colombia international footballers
1962 FIFA World Cup players
Atlético Bucaramanga footballers
Millonarios F.C. players
Deportivo Cali footballers
Independiente Medellín footballers
Deportivo Pereira footballers
Real Cartagena footballers
Colombian football managers
Deportes Tolima managers
Independiente Medellín managers
Cúcuta Deportivo managers
Association football wingers
Sportspeople from Santander Department